The NCAA Division I women's basketball tournament is a single-elimination tournament played each spring in the United States, currently featuring 68 women's college basketball teams from the Division I level of the National Collegiate Athletic Association (NCAA), to determine the national championship.

The tournament was preceded by the AIAW women's basketball tournament, which was organized by the Association for Intercollegiate Athletics for Women (AIAW) from 1972 to 1982. Basketball was one of 12 women's sports added to the NCAA championship program for the 1981–82 school year, as the NCAA engaged in battle with the AIAW for sole governance of women's collegiate sports. The AIAW continued to conduct its established championship program in the same 12 (and other) sports; however, after a year of dual women's championships, the NCAA prevailed, while the AIAW disbanded.

As of 2022, the tournament follows the same format and selection process as its men's counterpart, with 32 automatic bids awarded to the champions of the Division I conferences, and 36 "at-large bids" extended by the NCAA Selection Committee, which are placed into four regional divisions and seeded from 1 to 16. The four lowest-seeded automatic bids, and the four lowest-seeded at-large bids, compete in the First Four games to advance to the 64-team bracket in the first round. The national semi-finals, branded as the Women's Final Four, are traditionally scheduled on the same weekend as the men's Final Four, but in a different host city. Presently, the Women's Final Four uses a Friday/Sunday scheduling, with its games occurring one day prior to the men's Final Four and championship respectively.

Attendance and interest in the women's championship have grown over the years, especially from 2003 to 2016, when the final championship game was moved to the Tuesday following the Monday men's championship game. The tournament is often overshadowed by the more-prominent men's tournament; after a gender equality review following the 2021 tournament, the NCAA began to promote the women's tournament with the "March Madness" brand as with the men's tournament, and expanded it to the current 68-team format of the men's tournament. Still, the tournament receives a smaller amount of funding from broadcast rights (which are held by ESPN, and are pooled with those of other NCAA Division I championships besides golf and men's basketball) and sponsorship (which are sold by CBS and Turner Sports) than the men's tournament.

With 11 national titles, the UConn Huskies hold the record for the most NCAA Women's Division I Basketball Championships, which included four straight championships from 2013 through 2016. The team has also made the semi-finals for 14 consecutive tournaments.

Tournament format 
From 1982 to 1990, 1996 to 2002, 2017 to 2019 and since 2021, the Women's Final Four is usually played on the Friday before the Men's Final Four or the hours before the men played on the final Saturday of the tournament. The final, come 2023, will be played the Sunday afternoon following the Men's Final Four; from 2017 to 2019, 2021 and 2022, Sunday evening.

The tournament bracket is made up of champions from each Division I conference, which receive automatic bids. The remaining slots are at-large bids, with teams chosen by an NCAA selection committee. The selection process and tournament seedings are based on several factors, including team rankings, win–loss records, and NET data.
Since 2022, 68 teams qualify for the tournament played in March and April. Of these teams, 32 earn automatic bids by winning their respective conference tournaments. Since 2017 the Ivy League conducts its own post-season tournament. The remaining teams are granted "at-large" bids, which are extended by the NCAA Selection Committee. Dr. Marilyn McNeil, vice president/director of athletics at Monmouth University is the current chairwoman. On March 1, 2011, Bowling Green State University's director of intercollegiate athletics, Greg Christopher, was appointed chair of the NCAA Division I Women's Basketball Committee during the 2011–12 academic year.

The tournament begins with four opening-round games known as the First Four. Like the men's version, the women's First Four involves the four lowest-ranked conference champions playing for 16 seeds in the round of 64, and the four lowest-ranked at-large teams playing for their own spots in the round of 64.

The tournament is split into four regional tournaments, and each regional has teams seeded from 1 to 16, with the committee ostensibly making every region as comparable to the others as possible. The top-seeded team in each region plays the #16 team, the #2 team plays the #15, etc. (meaning that all first-round games involve teams whose seeds add up to 17).

Number of teams, and seeding 
The first NCAA women's basketball tournament was held in 1982. The AIAW also held a basketball tournament in 1982, but most of the top teams, including defending AIAW champion Louisiana Tech, decided to participate in the NCAA tournament.

The championship consisted of 32 teams from 1982 to 1985 (in 1983, 36), 40 teams from 1986 to 1988, and 48 teams from 1989 to 1993. From 1994 to 2021, 64 teams competed in each tournament. From 2022, the tournament will involve 68 teams, matching the size of the D-I men's tournament.

Prior to 1996, seeding was conducted on a regional basis. The top teams (eight in the 32-, 40-, and 48-team formats, and 16 in the 64-team format) were ranked and seeded on a national basis. The remaining teams were then seeded based on their geographic region. Teams were moved outside of its geographic region only if it was necessary to balance the bracket, or if the proximity of an opponent outside of its region would be comparable and a more competitive game would result. In 1993, all teams except for the top four were explicitly unseeded. The regional seeding resumed in 1994. In 1996, seeds were assigned on a national basis using an "S-Curve" format similar to the process used in selecting the field for the men's tournament.

The following table summarizes some of the key attributes of the seeding process:

Selection process

A special selection committee appointed by the NCAA determines which 68 teams will enter the tournament, and where they will be seeded and placed in the bracket. Because of the automatic bids, only 36 teams (the at-large bids) rely on the selection committee to secure them a spot in the tournament.

Women's NCAA Division I basketball champions

Team titles

Multiple NCAA championship coaches

NCAA Championship by Conference

Note: Conferences are listed by all champions' affiliations at that time; these do not necessarily match current affiliations.

NCAA Final Four locations

 1982 – Norfolk, Virginia
 1983 – Norfolk, Virginia
 1984 – Los Angeles, California
 1985 – Austin, Texas
 1986 – Lexington, Kentucky
 1987 – Austin, Texas
 1988 – Tacoma, Washington
 1989 – Tacoma, Washington
 1990 – Knoxville, Tennessee
 1991 – New Orleans, Louisiana
 1992 – Los Angeles, California
 1993 – Atlanta, Georgia
 1994 – Richmond, Virginia
 1995 – Minneapolis, Minnesota
 1996 – Charlotte, North Carolina
 1997 – Cincinnati, Ohio
 1998 – Kansas City, Missouri
 1999 – San Jose, California
 2000 – Philadelphia, Pennsylvania
 2001 – St. Louis, Missouri
 2002 – San Antonio, Texas
 2003 – Atlanta, Georgia
 2004 – New Orleans, Louisiana
 2005 – Indianapolis, Indiana
 2006 – Boston, Massachusetts
 2007 – Cleveland, Ohio
 2008 – Tampa, Florida
 2009 – St. Louis, Missouri
 2010 – San Antonio, Texas
 2011 – Indianapolis, Indiana
 2012 – Denver, Colorado
 2013 – New Orleans, Louisiana
 2014 – Nashville, Tennessee
 2015 – Tampa, Florida
 2016 – Indianapolis, Indiana
 2017 – Dallas, Texas
 2018 – Columbus, Ohio
 2019 – Tampa, Florida
 
 2021 – San Antonio, Texas
 2022 – Minneapolis, Minnesota
 2023 – Dallas, Texas
 2024 – Cleveland, Ohio
 2025 – Tampa, Florida
 2026 – Phoenix, Arizona
 2027 – Columbus, Ohio
 2028 – Indianapolis, Indiana
 2029 – San Antonio, Texas
 2030 – Portland, Oregon
 2031 – Dallas, Texas

Result by school and by year 

283 teams have appeared in the NCAA tournament in at least one year starting with 1982 (the initial year that the post-season tournament was under the auspices of the NCAA). The results for all years are shown in this table below.

Notes

Tournament trends

Top-ranked teams
Since the women's tournament began in 1982, 19 teams have entered the tournament ranked #1 in at least 1 poll and gone on to win the tournament:
 1982: Louisiana Tech
 1983: USC
 1986: Texas
 1989: Tennessee
 1995: UConn
 1998: Tennessee
 1999: Purdue
 2000: UConn
 2002: UConn
 2003: UConn
 2009: UConn
 2010: UConn
 2012: Baylor
 2014: UConn
 2015: UConn
 2016: UConn
 2019: Baylor
 2021: Stanford
 2022: South Carolina

Champions excluded the next year
Only once has the reigning champion (the previous year's winner) not made it to the tournament the next year.
 1985 champion Old Dominion went 15–13 in 1986.

No. 1 seeds
Since 1982, at least one #1 seed has made the Final Four every year.

Under coach Geno Auriemma, Connecticut has been seeded #1 a record 22 times. Tennessee is second with 21 #1 seeds.

All four #1 seeds have made it to the Final Four 4 times (champion in bold):
 1989 Auburn, Louisiana Tech, Maryland, Tennessee
 2012 Baylor, UConn, Notre Dame, Stanford
 2015 UConn, Maryland, Notre Dame, South Carolina
 2018 UConn, Mississippi State, Notre Dame, Louisville

The championship game has matched two #1 seeds 14 times:
 1983 USC beat Louisiana Tech
 1986 Texas beat USC
 1989 Tennessee beat Auburn
 1991 Tennessee beat Virginia
 1995 UConn beat Tennessee
 2000 UConn beat Tennessee
 2002 UConn beat Oklahoma
 2003 UConn beat Tennessee
 2010 UConn beat Stanford
 2012 Baylor beat Notre Dame
 2014 UConn beat Notre Dame
 2015 UConn beat Notre Dame
 2018 Notre Dame beat Mississippi State
 2019 Baylor beat Notre Dame

Three teams have beaten three #1 seeds during the course of a tournament (the largest number of such teams that can be faced) (all three teams won the national championship as beating a 3rd #1 seed in a single tournament can only happen in the finals):
 1987 Tennessee (beat Auburn, Long Beach State, Louisiana Tech)
 1988 Louisiana Tech (beat Auburn, Tennessee, Texas)
 2005 Baylor (beat LSU, Michigan State, North Carolina)

Prior to the expansion of the tournament to 64 teams, all four #1 seeds advanced to the Sweet Sixteen with three exceptions.  Notably, the first two times this occurred were at the hands of the same school:
 1986 East #1 seed Virginia lost to #8 seed James Madison
 1991 East #1 seed Penn State lost to #8 seed James Madison
 1992 Midwest #1 seed Iowa lost to #8 seed Southwest Missouri State

High seeds
 1999 was the first time in tournament history (since the expansion to 64 teams) that all top seeds (1, 2, 3, and 4 seeds) made it to the Sweet Sixteen.

Low seeds

Lowest seeds to reach each round since the expansion to 64 teams:
 Second Round: #16 seed
 Harvard in 1998 (the only #16 seed to beat a #1 seed in either the women's or men's tournament until 2018, and still the only one to do so in the women's tournament)
 Regional semifinals (Sweet Sixteen): #13 seed
 Texas A&M in 1994
 Liberty in 2005
 Marist in 2007
 Regional Finals (Elite Eight): #11 seed
 Gonzaga in 2011
 National semifinals (Final Four): #9 seed
 Arkansas in 1998
 National Finals (Championship Game): #5 seed
 Louisville in 2013
 National Champion: #3 seed
 North Carolina in 1994
 Tennessee in 1997

Best Performances by #14 & #15 Seeds
Unlike in the men's tournament, no #14 seed has beaten a #3 and no #15 seed has beaten a #2 seed, but they have come close.
 2 points: #14 Seed
 Austin Peay lost to UNC in 2003 (2 points, 72–70)
 Eastern Michigan lost to Boston College in 2004 (2 points, 58–56)
 Creighton lost to St. John's in 2012 (2 points, 69–67)
 Overtime games: #15 Seed
 UTSA lost to Baylor in 2009 (5 points, 87–82).  UTSA is the only #15 seed to take a game into overtime.
 1 point: #15 Seed
 Long Beach State lost to Oregon State in 2017 (1 point, 56–55)

First-round games
Since the expansion to 64 teams in 1994, each seed-pairing has played 108 first-round games with these results:
 The #1 seed is 107–1 against the #16 seed.
 The #2 & #3 seeds are 108–0 against the #15 & #14 seeds, respectively.
 The #4 seed is 101–7 against the #13 seed.
 The #5 seed is 85–23 against the #12 seed.
 The #6 seed is 75–33 against the #11 seed.
 The #7 seed is 71–37 against the #10 seed.
 The #8 seed is 53–55 against the #9 seed.

Second-round games
Since the expansion to 64 teams in 1994, the following results have occurred for each pairing:
 In the 1/16/8/9 bracket:

note: The 3 losses by the #1 seed vs #8/9 were: Duke (vs Michigan St, 2009), Ohio St (vs Boston College, 2006), Texas Tech (vs Notre Dame, 1998).
note: The #9 vs. #16 game was Arkansas over Harvard in 1998.
 In the 2/15/7/10 bracket:

 In the 3/14/6/11 bracket:

 In the 4/13/5/12 bracket:

Teams entering the tournament unbeaten
Of the 18 teams who have entered the tournament unbeaten, 9 went on to win the National Championship.

One exception is Cal Baptist, who was excluded from the 2021 tournament as a transitional Division I member, despite a 24–0 record.
 In 1986, Texas entered the tournament 30–0, beat USC for the national title, and ended the season 34–0.
 In 1990, Louisiana Tech entered the tournament 29–0, but lost in the Final Four to Auburn.
 In 1992, Vermont entered the tournament 29–0, but lost in the first round to George Washington.
 In 1993, Vermont entered the tournament 28–0, but lost in the first round to Rutgers.
 In 1995, UConn entered the tournament 29–0, beat Tennessee for the national title, and ended the season 35–0.
 In 1997, UConn entered the tournament 30–0, but lost in the Midwest Regional Final to Tennessee.
 In 1998, Tennessee (33–0) and Liberty (28–0) both entered the tournament unbeaten; Liberty lost in the first round to Tennessee, which went on to beat Louisiana Tech for the national title and ended the season 39–0.
 In 2002, 2009, and 2010, UConn entered the tournament 33–0, won the national title in each, and ended those seasons 39–0. They respectively beat Oklahoma, Louisville, and Stanford in those championship games.
 In 2012, Baylor entered the tournament 34–0, beat Notre Dame for the national title, and ended the season 40–0. The Lady Bears became the first team in NCAA college basketball history, for either women or men, to win 40 games in a season. Notably, Louisiana Tech went 40–5 during the 1979–80 season. This was during the AIAW era for women's basketball.
 In 2014, UConn (34–0) and Notre Dame (32–0) both entered the tournament unbeaten; UConn beat Notre Dame 79–58 for the national title, ended the season 40–0 and is the 8th team to end the season unbeaten.
 In 2015, Princeton entered the tournament 30–0, but lost in the second round to Maryland.
 In 2016, UConn entered the tournament 32–0, beat Syracuse for the national title, ending the season 38–0.
 In 2017, UConn entered the tournament 32–0, but lost in the Final Four to Mississippi State, ending their 111-game winning streak to finish 36–1.
 In 2018, UConn entered the tournament 32–0, but lost in the Final Four to Notre Dame, ending their 36-game winning streak to finish 36–1.

Undefeated teams not in the tournament
The NCAA tournament has undergone dramatic expansion since its first edition in 1982, and only one unbeaten team has failed to qualify for the tournament—California Baptist in 2021, which was 24–0 after winning the Western Athletic Conference Tournament. As, by definition, a team would have to win its conference tournament, and thus secure an automatic bid to the tournament, to be undefeated in a season, the only way a team could finish undefeated and not reach the tournament is if the team is banned from postseason play. (Other possibilities are that the team is independent, or is from a conference not yet eligible for an automatic bid.) Postseason bans can come about for one of two reasons:
 The team is serving a postseason ban due to NCAA sanctions.
 The team is transitioning from a lower NCAA division, during which time it is barred by NCAA rule from participation in NCAA-sponsored postseason play. This is the case for California Baptist, which began a transition from Division II in 2018 and thus cannot play in the NCAA tournament until 2023.
California Baptist was eligible for the WNIT because that tournament is not operated by the NCAA, unlike the men's version; the Lancers lost in the quarterfinals to eventual champion Rice.

Home state
Only one team has ever played the Final Four on its home court. Two other teams have played the Final Four in their home cities, and seven others have played the Final Four in their home states.

The only team to play on its home court was Texas in 1987, which lost its semifinal game at the Frank Erwin Special Events Center.

Old Dominion enjoyed nearly as large an advantage in 1983 when the Final Four was played at the Norfolk Scope in its home city of Norfolk, Virginia, but also lost its semifinal. The Scope has never been the Lady Monarchs' regular home court. ODU has always used on-campus arenas, first the ODU Fieldhouse and since 2002 Chartway Arena.  The following year, USC won the national title at Pauley Pavilion, the home court of its Los Angeles arch-rival UCLA.

Of the other teams to play in their home states, Stanford (1992) won the national title; Notre Dame (2011) lost in the championship game; and Western Kentucky (1986), Penn State (2000), Missouri State (2001), LSU (2004), and Baylor (2010) lost in the semifinals.

Championship margins
 Overtime games in a championship game:
 Tennessee 70, Virginia 67/OT (1991)
 Maryland 78, Duke 75/OT (2006)
 Smallest margin of victory in a championship game: 1 point
 North Carolina 60, Louisiana Tech 59 (1994)
 Baylor 82, Notre Dame 81 (2019)
 Stanford 54, Arizona 53 (2021)
 Biggest margin of victory in a championship game: 33 points
 UConn 93, Louisville 60 (2013)
 Margin of 10 points: Louisiana Tech (1982), Tennessee (1987 & 1989), Purdue (1999), UConn (2000, 2002, 2009, 2013, 2014, 2015 & 2016), and Baylor (2012) are teams to win every game in the tournament by 10 points or more on their way to a championship. The 2016 UConn team won every game by more than 20 points.
 Top 9 largest point differentials accumulated over the entire tournament by tournament champion.  Notably, Louisiana Tech's differential is prior to the expansion of 64 teams and the addition of one more round of play.
 2016 UConn (+239)
 2010 UConn (+214)
 2013 UConn (+208)
 2015 UConn (+197)
 2000 UConn (+187)
 2002 UConn (+161)
 2019 Baylor (+159)
 1982 Louisiana Tech (+158)
 2014 UConn (+156)

Same-conference championship games
7 championship games have featured two teams from the same conference (winner listed first and bolded):
 1989 SEC, Tennessee and Auburn
 1996 SEC, Tennessee and Georgia
 2006 ACC, Maryland and Duke
 2009 Big East, UConn and Louisville
 2013 Big East, UConn and Louisville
 2017 SEC, South Carolina and Mississippi State
 2021 Pac-12, Stanford and Arizona

Television coverage and revenues

Broadcast rights to the NCAA women's basketball tournament are included in a larger package covering the majority of Division I national championships outside of men's basketball (which is held by CBS Sports and Turner Sports), and golf (which is held by Golf Channel). ESPN has held exclusive rights to the tournament since 1996; beginning with an 11-year, $200 million contract renewal in 2003, ESPN would televise all 63 games in the tournament on television (increasing from 23), with games in the first and second rounds airing regionally on ESPN and ESPN2. Out-of-market games were carried via pay-per-view. Coverage later expanded to include ESPN's college sports-oriented network ESPNU, and ESPN360 for streaming.  In 2011, ESPN renewed this agreement through the 2023–24 season, in a deal reported to be worth $500 million in total (also adding international rights to the men's tournament for ESPN International).

In the first two rounds, one channel (typically ESPN or ESPN2's high definition feed) typically aired "whiparound" coverage during each window, carrying rolling coverage of all games in progress. ESPN's standard definition channels were used to broadcast games on a regional basis, while games could also be viewed in their entirety on ESPN3 or alternate channels. In 2021, ESPN adopted a broadcast arrangement similar to the men's tournament, with all games airing nationally in their entirety on either an ESPN linear channel or, for the first time, ABC. The Women's Final Four and championship remained exclusive to ESPN. In 2023, the national championship game will air on ABC for the first time; due to conflicts with ABC's prime time entertainment programming, the game will be played in the afternoon.

In data issued by the NCAA in 2021, it was stated that 15.9% of the value of the contract was allocated to the women's tournament, or approximately $6.1 million annually. In comparison, the contract for the men's tournament is valued at over $700 million annually. Amid scrutiny of inequality between the men's and women's tournaments that year, it has been suggested by critics that the structure of the NCAA's contract undervalues the media rights to the women's tournament. Based on average viewership, Emily Caron and Eben Novy-Williams of Sportico estimated that the women's tournament could fetch at least $20 million per-year if its media rights were sold separately. America East Conference commissioner Amy Huchthausen argued that the ESPN contract "provides a measure of financial certainty, but it does not provide women's basketball (or any of the other sports, for that matter) an incentive to grow". Following major media criticism of inequities between the 2021 men's and women's tournaments, the NCAA commissioned a comprehensive gender equity review of its championships by the law firm Kaplan Hecker & Fink. Among the report's findings was that U.S. television rights for the women's tournament would be worth at least $81 million annually by the time the current broadcast contract with ESPN expires in 2024. The current contract, which includes rights not only to the women's tournament but also 28 other NCAA championship events, provides the NCAA an average of $34 million over the life of the contract.

See also

 AIAW women's basketball tournament
 Women's National Invitation Tournament
 Women's Basketball Invitational
 NCAA Division I men's basketball tournament
 NCAA Division II women's basketball tournament
 NCAA Division III women's basketball tournament
 NAIA Women's Basketball Championships

References

External links

 
 Attendance history (Archived)
 Division I Women's Basketball Championships Records Books (Through 2020) (Archived)

Postseason college basketball competitions in the United States
 
Recurring sporting events established in 1982
College women's basketball competitions in the United States
NCAA Division I women's basketball tournament Final Four